The Sir Barton Stakes is a Thoroughbred horse race run annually in early December at Woodbine Racetrack in Toronto, Ontario, Canada. An Ontario Sire Stakes, it is a restricted race for horses age three and older. Raced over a distance of  miles on Polytrack, the Sir Barton Stakes currently carries a purse of $93,938.

Originally restricted to three-year-olds, it is now open to older horses.

Inaugurated in 1975 at Greenwood Raceway and moved to Woodbine Racetrack in 1994, the race is named for the U.S. Racing Hall of Fame colt Sir Barton, who was the 1st U.S. Triple Crown Champion.

Since inception, the Sir Barton Stakes has been raced at  a variety of distances:
 7 furlongs - 1975
 1 mile - 1976-1993
  miles - 1994 to present

Records
Speed  record:
 1:42.16 - Freitag (2016 - Track Record) (at current distance of  miles on Polytrack)
 1:34.00 - Twist The Snow  (1989) (New stakes and track record at 1 mile on dirt)

Most wins:
 3 - Arch Hall (2004, 2005, 2006)
 2 - Kingsport (2015, 2017)

Most wins by a jockey:
 3 - Gary Stahlbaum (1980, 1982, 1987)
 4 - Patrick Husbands (2004, 2005, 2006, 2015)

Most wins by a trainer:
 3 - Mark E. Casse (2004, 2005, 2006)

Most wins by an owner:
 3 - Melnyk Racing Stable (2004, 2005, 2006)

Winners of the Sir Barton Stakes

References
 The Sir Barton Stakes at Pedigree Query
 Sir Barton Stakes (Ontario Sire Stakes) at Woodbine Racetrack
 The Sir Barton Stakes at the NTRA

Ontario Sire Stakes
Ungraded stakes races in Canada
Recurring sporting events established in 1975
Woodbine Racetrack
1975 establishments in Ontario